Milton Benjamin Badt (1884 – April 2, 1966) was a justice of the Supreme Court of Nevada from 1947 to 1966.

His family was Orthodox Jewish and his father immigrated from Polish Prussia. Badt was born in San Francisco and studied in California but established his practice in Elko, Nevada, where his parents lived. He had a wife Gertrude and two children. He was a Republican.

He was appointed March 26, 1947 to fill E. L. J. Taber's vacancy and elected November 1948 to fulfill the rest of his unexpired term

Badt suffered a heart attack in March 1966 at the age of 81, and died the following month. Jon R. Collins was appointed June 5, 1966 to succeed him.

References

Justices of the Nevada Supreme Court
1884 births
1966 deaths
People from San Francisco
Nevada Republicans
20th-century American judges
Chief Justices of the Nevada Supreme Court